The following is a list of Stadiums in Spain, ordered by capacity. Only stadiums with a capacity of 10,000 or more are included in this list. In the second list, the minimum capacity is 5,000.

Current stadiums

Stadiums with a capacity below 10,000

Stadiums with a capacity of at least 5,000 are included.

Future stadiums

See also
List of association football stadiums by capacity
List of European stadiums by capacity
List of indoor arenas in Spain

References

External links
Blog on Spanish Stadiums

Spain
Stadiums
Stadiums
Spain